Christopher Seton Abele (born January 28, 1967) is an American businessman and Democratic Party politician. He served as the 6th Milwaukee County Executive from 2011 to 2020.  Abele is the son of American businessman John Abele, the co-founder of Boston Scientific. Abele serves as a trustee of the Argosy Foundation, a charitable trust established with an endowment from his father.

Business career
In 1996, Abele, with Chris Kerr, founded SteriLogic Waste Systems, which serves hospitals and medical clinics in managing sharps waste. Abele served as CEO of SteriLogic from 1996 to 2004. In 2004, Abele became Chairman of the company to devote more time to philanthropic efforts. In 2006, SteriLogic merged with Medsolutions and in 2007, Kerr and Abele sold the majority of SteriLogic to Stericycle. The remainder of SteriLogic was restructured the remainder as Oxus Environmental.

In 2001, Abele and his business partner Steve Mech founded CSA Commercial, a Milwaukee-based real estate and development company.

Prior to his election as Milwaukee County Executive, Abele served as CEO of the Argosy Foundation. In 2011, Abele stepped down as CEO and was replaced by his sister, Jeneye. Abele remains a trustee of the foundation.

Abele invested $10 million into a venture fund, CSA Partners LLC, for Milwaukee start-ups. The LLC was formed with Brian Taffora and Pat Farley. They invested into gener8tor's Fund II and opened Ward 4 (Milwaukee, WI startup accelerator space) in remodelled space inside the former John Pritzlaff Hardware Company Building.

2011 Milwaukee County Executive race
On January 4, 2011, Abele formally announced that he entered the race for Milwaukee County Executive.  Abele and Stone received the most votes and advanced on to a run-off election that was held on April 5, 2011. On April 6, 2011, Abele defeated Republican challenger Jeff Stone, and was sworn in on April 21, 2011.

Issue positions

Ideology and party affiliation
Abele contributed primarily to Democratic campaigns and the Democratic Party. Formerly, Abele served on a number of finance committees. This included the 2002 campaign for former Governor Jim Doyle, where he helped with John Kerry's presidential fundraising, and donated to Barack Obama's 2008 presidential campaign. The Milwaukee Journal Sentinel's Daniel Bice reported that Abele donated to the campaigns of Republican state legislators including Joe Sanfelippo and Dale Kooyenga, both of whom have played roles in the passage of bills that have increased Abele's power as Milwaukee County executive.

Endorsements
On February 12, 2011, Abele received the endorsement of the Milwaukee Journal Sentinel, which stated "Chris Abele's leadership on nonprofit boards, his experience running two family companies and his skill managing the Argosy Foundation make him a solid choice for county executive", and "Abele has the right experience and the right vision. Abele could be a game-changer". On April 2, 2011, the Milwaukee Journal Sentinel once again endorsed Abele over Jeff Stone, stating "Milwaukee County needs transformative change. One candidate provides the better chance to accomplish that."

Milwaukee County Executive
Abele took the oath of office to become Milwaukee County Executive on April 25, 2011, succeeding Interim County Executive Marvin Pratt.

On June 9, 2011, citing concerns about budget cuts at the state level, Abele indicated his opposition to a planned $775,000 investment in public art at the Milwaukee County Courthouse. A year later, in June 2012, Abele signed a resolution placing the public art program on "hiatus" and authorizing use of the program's $500,000 in accumulated funds toward deferred maintenance instead of artwork.

On June 10, 2011, he announced his intention to provide health care coverage to domestic partners of Milwaukee County employees. This was approved by the County Board on July 28, 2011, and signed into law by Abele on August 3, 2011. Abele declined to seek re-election in 2020.

Personal life
Abele grew up in Concord, Massachusetts, but after attending college at Lawrence University in Appleton, Wisconsin from 1991 to 1995, he decided to stay in Milwaukee.

He is previously divorced and has three children. He was included in the Milwaukee Business Journal "40 under 40" and "Power Broker" lists in 2000 and 2010, respectively.

He is a member of the Board of Governors for the Boys & Girls Clubs of America, Inc., a Trustee for Milwaukee Institute of Art & Design Inc, and the chairman for Milwaukee Symphony Orchestra.

Electoral history

| colspan="6" style="text-align:center;background-color: #e9e9e9;"| Primary Election, February 15, 2011

| colspan="6" style="text-align:center;background-color: #e9e9e9;"| General Election, April 5, 2011

| colspan="6" style="text-align:center;background-color: #e9e9e9;"| General Election, April 3, 2012

| colspan="6" style="text-align:center;background-color: #e9e9e9;"| Primary Election, February 16, 2016

| colspan="6" style="text-align:center;background-color: #e9e9e9;"| General Election, April 5, 2016

References

External links
Milwaukee County Executive website
Chris Abele for Milwaukee County Executive campaign

1967 births
Living people
People from Concord, Massachusetts
Politicians from Milwaukee
Milwaukee County Executives
Businesspeople from Wisconsin
Lawrence University alumni
Medical College of Wisconsin
Wisconsin Democrats
Philanthropists from Wisconsin
21st-century American politicians